Abdelhamid Kermali (April 24, 1931 – April 13, 2013) was an Algerian footballer and football manager of the Algerian national team.

Kermali was born in Akbou, Algeria. He played in several Algerian clubs as a striker, including USM Alger, before leaving for France to play for FC Mulhouse, AS Cannes and Olympique Lyonnais, with whom he made 65 Ligue 1 appearances, scoring 14 goals.

As a manager, Kermali led the Algerian national team to its first continental trophy, winning the 1990 African Cup of Nations hosted in Algeria. He also guided the team to the title of the 1991 Afro-Asian Cup of Nations.

References

Bibliography

Algerian footballers
Algerian football managers
FLN football team players
1931 births
2013 deaths
FC Mulhouse players
AS Cannes players
Olympique Lyonnais players
Ligue 1 players
USM Alger players
People from Akbou
Algeria national football team managers
MC Alger managers
Expatriate football managers in Tunisia
Algerian expatriate sportspeople in Tunisia
ES Sétif players
ES Sétif managers
1990 African Cup of Nations managers
1992 African Cup of Nations managers
Association football forwards
21st-century Algerian people